Mind at Large is a concept proposed by Aldous Huxley to help interpret psychedelic experience. He maintained that the human mind filters reality under normal circumstances and that psychedelic drugs remove the filter, exposing the user to a Mind at Large.

Concept
Huxley introduced the concept of Mind at Large in his books The Doors of Perception (1954) and Heaven and Hell (1956). It was influenced by the ideas of the philosopher C. D. Broad.

Huxley held that psychedelic drugs open a 'Reducing Valve' in the brain and nervous system that ordinarily inhibits Mind at Large from reaching the conscious mind. In the aforementioned books, Huxley explores the idea that the human mind has evolved to filter wider planes of reality, partly because handling the details of all of the impressions and images coming in would be unbearable and partly because it has been taught to do so. He believes that psychoactive drugs can partly remove this filter, which leaves the drug user exposed to Mind at Large.

During an experiment conducted by the British psychiatrist Humphrey Osmond in 1953, Huxley was administered the psychedelic drug mescaline, and was prompted by Osmond to comment on the various stimuli around him, such as books and flowers. Huxley recorded aspects of their conversation in The Doors of Perception, focusing on what he said in the recordings. He observed that everyday objects lose their functionality, and suddenly exist "as such"; space and dimension become irrelevant, with perceptions seemingly being enlarged, and at times even overwhelming.

In The Doors of Perception, Huxley cites a 1949 paper by Cambridge Philosopher C. D. Broad ('The Relevance of Psychical Research to Philosophy' ):

 
However, Huxley omits an important qualifier  from the citation of Broad that he employs in The Doors of Perception. Broad's original quotation includes the word 'potentially' thus:Each person is at each moment potentially capable of remembering all that has ever happened to him and of perceiving everything that is happening everywhere in the universe. Broad's paper concerned the implications for philosophy of a number of apparently veridical instances of ESP he had encountered in association with his membership and Presidency of The Society for Psychical Research. Broad had been particularly impressed by reports of the card guessing abilities of a number of subjects, including Basil Shackleton as documented in experiments carried out by the British Psychical Researcher, Dr Samuel Soal. Broad ends his paper by concluding that such evidence appears to present a counterexample to the Basic Limiting Principles he sets out in the same paper and particularly Basic Limiting Principle (4.1) that states: (4.1) It is impossible for a person to perceive a physical event or a material thing except by means of sensations which that event or thing produces in his mind. ...Huxley's misquotation and omission of the word 'potentially' changes the intended emphasis of Broad's paper from which the citation is taken. Broad was summarising the logical implications of a single verified psychical counterexample to his Basic Limiting Principle 4.1 whereas Huxley employs it as a potential consequence of psychedelic experience. Mind at Large in The Doors of Perception is a description of the expanded consciousness that Huxley experienced following the ingestion of 0.4g of mescaline in Water but the misquotation of Broad is taken out of its context concerning psychical events and applied by Huxley as a basis for his Mind at Large metaphor of expanded consciousness under psychedelics.

The power of the altered quotation has led to widespread misattribution of it to Huxley.

The Doors of Perception includes Huxley's descriptions of his experiences with mescaline and includes a total of eight references to 'Mind at Large'.  In modern psychedelic research, the closest comparator is that of Oceanic Boundlessness.

In The Doors of Perception, Huxley stated:

References to the concept
In 2009, journalist Andrew Sullivan published excerpts from the writing of Barbara Bradley Hagerty in The Atlantic. In the excerpts, Hagerty connects the research of neuroscientist Andrew Newberg on religious experiences in Catholic nuns and Buddhist monks to Huxley's concept of Mind at Large.

See also 

 Altered state of consciousness
 Collective unconscious
 Cosmic consciousness
 Default mode network
 Eight-circuit model of consciousness
 Higher consciousness
 Panpsychism
 Pantheism

References

Aldous Huxley
Psychedelia
Reality
Theory of mind